Theresa Edem Isemin  (born Theresa Edem) is a Nigerian actress and filmmaker. She won the ‘Best Actress in a Feature Film’ award at the Las Vegas Black Film Festival and has been nominated for several awards including the prestigious African Movie Academy Awards.

Greater success came to her career after the performance on Tinsel, and has since gone on to star in several films and TV series, including Ayamma: Music in the Forest, My Village People, Forbidden and The Olive.

Early life and education 
Theresa was born in Uyo, Akwa Ibom State into a family of four children, of which she is the fourth and only girl. She attended primary school and secondary school in Akwa Ibom before heading off to university at The Federal University of Technology Owerri. She graduated Bs. Tech. in Animal Science and Technology.

In December 2015, Theresa married her friend of many years, Ubong Isemin. The ceremony was held in Uyo.

Career 

Theresa started acting professionally in 2012, after completing the 'Acting Course’ at The Royal Arts Academy. Her first major role was in After The Proposal, starring alongside Uche Jombo, Anthony Monjaro, Patience Ozokwor, Desmond Elliot and Belinda Effah. Following that, she has starred in several films, TV series and stage plays, including The Antique, Tinsel and Twenty-Five. She has also featured in number of Africa Magic Original Films.

Her cinema debut was in the 2016 epic, Ayamma. she was also in the movie my village people along side Bovi and Nkem Owoh.

Filmography

Film

Television

Web

Stage

Radio

Awards and nominations

References

External links
https://www.dstv.com/en-ng/news/hotel-majestic-ends-20160114/ 
https://royalartsacademy.com.ng/
https://www.youtube.com/watch?v=I77Gq-y6FDo/
https://www.youtube.com/watch?v=-Mj5JQ4nyJE/ 
https://ibakatv.com/a-girl-s-note/
https://www.youtube.com/watch?v=vdbQmL0LCKU/ 
http://www.imdb.com/title/tt5346806/?ref_=nv_sr_5
http://menagainstgbv.org/ 
http://www.mtvshuga.com/ MTV
http://nigeria.unfpa.org/
http://youthhubafrica.org/
https://irokotv.com/
https://twitter.com/darasenrichards?lang=en/
https://ibakatv.com/ ibakatv

21st-century Nigerian actresses
Nigerian film actresses
Nigerian stage actresses
People from Akwa Ibom State
Living people
Actresses from Akwa Ibom State
Nigerian television actresses
1986 births
Nigerian film producers
Nigerian female models
Federal University of Technology Owerri alumni